This article lists awards and honors received by Richard Nixon.

Honorary degrees
Nixon received honorary degrees from the following educational institutions:

Bradley University, Doctor of Laws, 1951
University of Tehran, 1953
Lowell Technological Institute, Doctor of Science, 1954 
Whittier College, Doctor of Laws, 1954
Temple University, Doctor of Humane Letters, 1955
Lafayette College, Doctor of Laws, 1956
Bethany College, Doctor of Laws, 1957
Defiance College, Doctor of Laws, 1957
DePauw University, Doctor of Laws, 1957
Michigan State University, Doctor of Laws, 1957
Wilberforce University, Doctor of Humanities, 1957
Yeshiva University, Doctor of Laws, 1957
Fordham University, Doctor of Laws, 1959
Thiel College, Doctor of Humane Letters, 1959
University of San Diego, Doctor of Laws, 1959

Other honors
Egypt's Order of the Nile, 1974
Member of France's Académie des Beaux-Arts, elected 1985, inducted 1987
National Fitness Foundation's Public Service Award, 1986

Namesakes
Richard M. Nixon Parkway, Yorba Linda, California
Richard M. Nixon Elementary School, Yorba Linda, California
Nixon Elementary School, Hiawatha, Iowa
Richard M. Nixon High School, Monrovia, Liberia
Nixon Library, Yuen Long, Hong Kong

Postage stamps
Richard Nixon has appeared on the following postage stamps:
A United States 32-cent commemorative stamp, issued April 26, 1995.
A set of six stamps from Umm Al Quwain in 1972, commemorating Nixon's visit to China.
Two Nevis $3 commemorative stamps, issued May 21, 2010 as part of a pane commemorating the 50th anniversary of John F. Kennedy's election as President.
Liberia stamps issued in 1982 and 2009 as part of series commemorating U.S. presidents.

See also
 Presidential memorials in the United States

References

Awards and honors
Nixon, Richard